Schollaert Channel is a channel in the Antarctic between Anvers Island on the southwest and Brabant Island on the northeast, connecting Dallmann Bay and Gerlache Strait, in the Palmer Archipelago. It was discovered in 1898 by the Belgian Antarctic Expedition under Gerlache, who named it for the Belgian statesman Frans Schollaert.

See also
 Gerlache Strait Geology

Straits of the Palmer Archipelago